The 2005–06 Adelaide United FC season was the club's second season since its establishment in 2003. The club participated in the A-League for the first time after the National Soccer League was replaced.

Continuing their good form from the final season of the NSL, Adelaide United finished as Premiers in the inaugural season of the Hyundai A-League.

The Reds were bundled out of the finals race in straight sets losing to Sydney FC in the two leg semi final and then Central Coast Mariners 1–0 in the preliminary final at Hindmarsh.

Players

Transfers

Transfers in

Transfers out

Loans out

Squad statistics

Appearances and goals

{| class="wikitable sortable plainrowheaders" style="text-align:center"
|-
! rowspan="2" |
! rowspan="2" |
! rowspan="2" style="width:180px;" |Name
! colspan="2" style="width:87px;" |A-League
! colspan="2" style="width:87px;" |Pre-Season Challenge Cup
! colspan="2" style="width:87px;" |OFC Club Championship
! colspan="2" style="width:87px;" |Total
|-
!
!Goals
!
!Goals
!
!Goals
!
!Goals
|-
|1
|GK
! scope="row" | Daniel Beltrame

|14
|0

|3
|0

|2
|0

!19
!0
|-
|2
|DF
! scope="row" | Richie Alagich

|18+5
|0

|3
|0

|2
|0

!28
!0
|-
|3
|DF
! scope="row" | Kristian Rees

|15+7
|1

|3
|0

|0
|0

!25
!1
|-
|4
|DF
! scope="row" | Angelo Costanzo

|24
|0

|3
|0

|2
|0

!29
!0
|-
|5
|DF
! scope="row" | Michael Valkanis

|24
|3

|3
|2

|2
|0

!29
!5
|-
|6
|MF
! scope="row" | Ross Aloisi

|23
|2

|3
|1

|2
|0

!29
!3
|-
|7
|MF
! scope="row" | Lucas Pantelis

|13+4
|1

|1
|0

|0+2
|0

!20
!1
|-
|8
|FW
! scope="row" | Carl Veart

|23
|7

|3
|0

|2
|0

!28
!7
|-
|9
|DF
! scope="row" | Matthew Kemp

|11+2
|0

|2+1
|0

|2
|0

!18
!0
|-
|10
|FW
! scope="row" | Fernando

|17+1
|7

|0
|0

|0
|0

!18
!7
|-
|11
|MF
! scope="row" | Louis Brain

|6+11
|3

|0
|0

|0+2
|0

!19
!3
|-
|12
|FW
! scope="row" | Chad Bugeja

|1+8
|0

|0+3
|0

|0+1
|0

!13
!0
|-
|13
|MF
! scope="row" | Travis Dodd

|20+3
|3

|3
|0

|2
|0

!28
!4
|-
|14
|DF
! scope="row" | Aaron Goulding

|7+2
|0

|0+2
|0

|2
|0

!13
!0
|-
|15
|FW
! scope="row" | Michael Matricciani

|0+3
|0

|0
|0

|0
|0

!3
!0
|-
|17
|DF
! scope="row" | Adam van Dommele

|19
|0

|3
|1

|2
|0

!24
!1
|-
|18
|DF
! scope="row" | Robert Cornthwaite

|2+9
|0

|0
|0

|0
|0

!11
!0
|-
|20
|GK
! scope="row" | Robert Bajic

|10+1
|0

|0
|0

|0
|0

!11
!0
|-
|21
|MF
! scope="row" | Jason Spagnuolo

|0+1
|0

|0
|0

|0
|0

!1
!0
|-
!colspan="14"|Players sold but featured this season
|-
|10
|MF
! scope="row" | Aurelio Vidmar

|0
|0

|2
|0

|0
|0

!2
!0
|-
|16
|MF
! scope="row" | Tony Hatzis

|0+1
|0

|0
|0

|0
|0

!1
!0
|-
|19
|FW
! scope="row" | Shengqing Qu

|17+2
|7

|1+2
|0

|2
|0

!24
!7
|}

Disciplinary record

Pre-season

Friendlies

Pre-Season Challenge Cup

Competitions

A-League

League table

Matches

Finals Series

OFC Club Championship

Qualification zone

Awards

References

External links
 Official Website

2005-06
2005–06 A-League season by team